Urdaly (Urźalı) is a rural locality (a village) in Yangatausky Selsoviet, Salavatsky District, Bashkortostan, Russia. The population was 20 as of 2010. There is 1 street.

Geography 
Urdaly is located 36 km north of Maloyaz (the district's administrative centre) by road. Musatovo is the nearest rural locality.

References 

Rural localities in Salavatsky District